Southwestern is a diversified, international, employee-owned family of companies.

History
In 1855, Southwestern Publishing House was established in Nashville, Tennessee. The company's name was chosen because, at that time, Nashville was in the southwestern part of the United States. Founded by the Baptist minister James Robinson Graves, Southwestern originally published The Tennessee Baptist, a Southern Baptist newspaper, and religious booklets which were sold by mail for 20¢ and 30¢ each.

Before the Civil War, most bibles were printed in the North, rather than the South. Graves acquired stereotype plates from the North and began printing bibles for sale in August 1861. He also produced and sold educational books. After the 1864 Battle of Nashville resulted in a Union victory, Graves relocated to Memphis, as he felt vulnerable because of articles he had published against the North. The company resumed publishing in 1867.

In 1868, Graves discontinued the company’s mail order business, and began training young men as independent dealers to sell bibles and educational books door-to-door as a way to earn money for college. Graves retired in 1871.

In 1879 the company relocated to Nashville under the new ownership of Jacob Florida. In 1899, P. B. Jones acquired majority ownership and became President and General Manager. In 1921, J. B. Henderson, a sixteen-year veteran who started in the summer sales program became the sole owner. During the 1920s, the firm grew to one of the largest person-to-person sales companies in America.

By 1947, Southwestern had lost nearly all of its independent dealers as a result of World War II. It was rebuilt, and experienced tremendous growth as the United States rebounded from the Great Depression. The number of independent reps grew to over 1,500.

In 1959 Oldham, a 24-year veteran who started in the summer sales program, became the majority shareholder of Southwestern; his ownership role would last until 1968, and his presidential role would last until 1972. J. Fred Landers was also made 49% owner at this time and continued his career with Southwestern until he died in 1987.  The Southwestern Family of Companies headquarters is named after Fred for his deep contributions to the culture of the company.  Dedicated by Spencer Hays in 1989.

In 1968, Times-Mirror Company acquired ownership of Southwestern.

In 1972, Spencer Hays, a fourteen-year veteran who started in the summer sales program, became president.

In 1975, Times-Mirror formed a fund-raising company called Nashville Educational Marketing Services under Southwestern, later to be renamed Great American Opportunities.  Jerry Heffel became the company's president in 1980. In 1982, executives of the firm purchased Southwestern and sister-company Great American Opportunities by a leveraged buyout from Times-Mirror, forming Southwestern/Great American, Hays was named executive chairman of the board and Ralph Mosley was named chairman and CEO.

Southwestern earned position 4,832 on the Inc. 5000 list in 2012 of the fastest growing private companies in the United States.

Subsidiaries
After the leveraged buyout in 1982 from Times-Mirror that formed Southwestern/Great American, the family of companies continued to expand. Their services now include consulting, fundraising, financial services, real estate, and executive search.

Southwestern Advantage

Since 1868, Southwestern Advantage has operated a direct marketing sales program that recruits and trains college and university students as independent contractors. The company recruits a few thousand American and a few hundred European university students to sell educational books, software, apps, and subscription websites during the summer.

Other enterprises 
Southwestern Legacy Insurance Group was founded in 2021. 

Southwestern Consulting

Great American Opportunities is a school fundraising company where students can participate in magazine fundraisers and the like. In 2012, the firm acquired the assets of QSP, making it the largest school fundraising company in North America. In January 2019 Great American Opportunities realized it was bleeding, losing millions of dollars over Q4 of 2018. Henry Bedford and Dustin Hillis “restructured” the company selling off all products and distribution channels, firing the entire salesforce, immediately ceasing all benefits and pay, and only offering the donation platform and magazine line to the new 1099-based salesforce that remained. This is now called "Southwestern Fundraising".

Southwestern Publishing Group was acquired as Favorite Recipes Press in 1982 by Fuller and Dees as a custom book publisher focused on cookbooks to be sold for fundraising purposes. Since that time, over 1,500 titles have been published. In 2011, it was renamed Southwestern Publishing Group

Southwestern Investment Group, (a Raymond James Financial affiliate) was founded in 2002.

Global Educational Concepts is a designated sponsor of the U.S. Department of State's J-1 Summer Work Travel and Internship programs. The firm is headquartered in Nashville, TN. The firm is a member of the Alliance for International Educational and Cultural Exchange and the World Youth Student and Educational (WYSE) Travel Confederation.

Family Heritage Life Insurance Company of America was started as a supplemental insurance company in 1989.  Southwestern sold the assets to Torchmark Corporation in October 2012.

Thinking Ahead is a Nashville-based executive search firm founded in 1982.

Southwestern Travel Group a travel agency.

References

Companies based in Nashville, Tennessee
Privately held companies based in Tennessee
Companies formed by management buyout